To the Highest Bidder is a lost 1918 silent film drama  directed by Tom Terriss and starring Alice Joyce. It was produced by the Vitagraph Company of America and distributed by a releasing company V-L-S-E.

Cast
Alice Joyce - Barbara Preston
Percy Standing - Stephen Jarvis
Walter McGrail - David Whitcomb
Edna Murphy  - Jennie
Mary Carr - Miss Cottle

unbilled
Stephen Carr - Jimmy Preston
Jules Cowles - Peg Morrison

References

External links

1918 films
American silent feature films
Lost American films
American black-and-white films
Vitagraph Studios films
Films based on American novels
Films directed by Tom Terriss
1910s American films